The Bakersfield Register of Historic Places and Areas of Historic Interest consist of buildings and sites designated by the City of Bakersfield, California, as significant historic resources.

Bakersfield's historic preservation program operates on a voluntary basis. The city may not designate a property on its register without being affirmatively petitioned by the property owner requesting inclusion. The program is overseen by a Historic Preservation Commission made up of citizens appointed by the City Council with special expertise and interest in historic preservation.

In the first five years of the city's historic preservation program (1992-1997), 12 buildings were listed on the Bakersfield Register of Historic Places.  In the more than 20 years thereafter, only three buildings and a cemetery have been added. With only 16 sites on its local register (compared to more than 300 sites designated by the City of Fresno), Bakersfield has been criticized for its lack of focus on historic preservation.

These listings represent local designations by the City of Bakersfield.  In addition, five buildings in Bakersfield have been listed on the National Register of Historic Places (NRHP) and are also listed below. Of the five buildings listed on the NRHP, only the Jastro Building (also known as the Standard Oil Building) has been cross-designated on the Bakersfield Register of Historic Places. There are also four sites within the city that have been designated as California Historical Landmarks; two of these buildings no longer exist, and none of the state landmarks have been cross-designated on the Bakersfield Register of Historic Places.

A map displaying the locations of Bakersfield's designated historic places and areas of historic interest, as well as the four buildings listed on the NRHP and four sites listed as California Historical Landmarks, can be viewed by clicking "OpenStreetMap" in the template found to the right below.

Bakersfield Register of Historic Places

Bakersfield Areas of Historic Interest

NRHP listings in Bakersfield

California Historical Landmarks in Bakersfield

See also
 National Register of Historic Places listings in Kern County, California
 California Historical Landmarks in Kern County, California

References

Bakersfield
Bakersfield
Bakersfield
Bakersfield